Perdeli pilav is a Turkish food, typically consisting of rice with chicken, onion and peanuts enveloped in a thin layer of dough, topped with almonds. The pilaf has a shape similar to a cake, and is then served in slices.

Curtain Pilaf has been registered and geographical indication by the Turkish Patent and Trademark Office.

See also
 Pilaf

External links
 "perdeli pilav.", TDK Online Dictionary, 2009.
 "perdeli pilav ingredients and preparation." Lezzetler.com, 2009.
 Perdeli pilav recipe 
 Perdeli pilav recipe 

Turkish cuisine
Rice dishes
Almond dishes